Newsday is a news programme on BBC World News that was first broadcast on 13 June 2011. The programme is normally hosted by Karishma Vaswani in Singapore. The programme began as a dual-presented bulletin from Singapore and London. During important news stories, the programme has previously been broadcast from Washington with either Katty Kay or Laura Trevelyan instead of the traditional London broadcast. Such news stories have included the death of Muhammad Ali, Hillary Clinton receiving the Democratic nomination, and Donald Trump getting important votes in his presidential nomination for the Republican Party.

The programme is broadcast around the world on BBC World News, as well as PBS affiliates in America, and is also shown in the UK on the domestic BBC News channel throughout the night, with the 23:00, 00:00 and 01:00 GMT bulletins. Newsday is sometimes broadcast on BBC One as part of the channel's overnight simulcast of BBC News. It covers international news with a specific focus on Asia and its financial markets.

BBC World News invested in a new Asia Pacific news HQ in Singapore with broadcasts commencing from Monday 3 August 2015 with a revamped studio and graphics and theme music composed by David Lowe.

Schedule 
Newsday is aired on weekdays on BBC World News. The programme acts as a morning programme for Asia, an overnight broadcast in Europe and the UK and a late night news programme for the Americas. It features analysis and discussion of the top news stories of the day and also previews the exclusive reports, correspondent feature films and interviews.

On 18 June 2012, Newsday broadcast times were changed to 23:00–02:00 GMT (22:00–01:00 GMT in summer time) on Sunday to Thursday. It is shown from 00:00–02:00 on Monday to Thursday in the UK.

A look at major news events from the past are shown in "This Week in History" for UK and PBS viewers while commercial breaks are broadcast for international viewers.

During the UK's principle COVID-19 pandemic periods, Newsday was not broadcast from 27 March 2020 to 20 July 2021; during that time the slot was temporarily replaced with additional half-hour BBC World News bulletins.

Presenters 
The programme previously featured split presentation, with a presenter in London and a presenter in Singapore each introducing reports and interviewing occasional guests in-studio. The London presenter also presented links for UK viewers during commercial breaks, while the Singapore presenter goes on to present Asia Business Report at the bottom of each hour. During major events in North America the programme is also presented from Washington.

On occasion the programme is broadcast from other locations, such as in November 2013 when Rico Hizon co-presented from Tacloban, Philippines following Typhoon Haiyan. In January 2014 for a while Sharma presented from Singapore and Hizon from London. Madera reported from Poland during 2015 election. During the last week of May 2017, Hizon presented from London and Sharanjit Leyl from Singapore.

For a two-month period from February to April 2018, Leyl presented Newsday from London, with Hizon or Oi in Singapore. This was due to Sharma being absent for this period of time, as she was writing a book. On Sharma's return on 3 April 2018, she announced that she will present from Singapore in a few weeks time.

During coverage of continuous international events, such as the Summer Olympics, the Newsday broadcasts may be presented by only a single presenter from the Singapore studio, rather than split broadcasting with a newsreader in the London studio.

Former Singapore presenters

Former London presenters

References

External links
 BBC News Channel
Newsday BBC World News

2011 British television series debuts
2020s British television series
BBC World News shows